Trinjan was a Punjabi tradition of women gathering, spinning charkhas, and singing songs. It was customary in Punjabi culture, where women would sit together and engage in other domestic crafts like spinning, weaving, and singing. Trinjan was a symbol of women's strength, creativity, and emotional, cultural, ecological, and social ties.

Spinning 
Hand spinning was integrally related to Trinjan, with women spinning and singing together in groups. Trinjan has long been a place of togetherness, collaborative wisdom, and shared abilities. The night trinjan was called as ',' and the day Trinjan was known as '  .'

Trinjan songs 
'Trinjan' refers to assembling for activities such as plying 'Charkhas' and singing songs. Trinjan songs have a distinctive status in Punjabi folk music. Trinjan songs were an expression of contemporary women's desires and sorrows. The sound of the spinning wheel used to blend as if it was an instrument.

Dance
'Trinjan' a dance type include Punjabi Giddha and Kikkli dances.

Presently
These traditions began to dwindle as time passed. It has been lost as a result of industrialization, the Green Revolution, and individualism.

Gallery

References 

Punjabi culture